Bachir Bensaddek is a Canadian television director of Algerian Berber descent, best known for his co-direction of 2002 Emmy Award-winning TV series Cirque du Soleil: Fire Within.

Born in Algeria in the year 1972, Bensaddek came to Montreal, Quebec, Canada in 1992 as a student before immigrating to Canada. Bensaddek wrote a play in 2004 entitled Montréal la blanche about Algerian immigrants in Quebec.

In May 2011, he released his documentary film Rap arabe, an ORBI-XXI production, covering the rap scene in three countries (Morocco, Lebanon, Syria) with a number of rappers including Malikah, Ashekman, Lil Zac and Don Bigg. It had its premiere at the 27th Festival international de cinéma Vues d'Afrique, and was rebroadcast on RDI, TV5 and Al Jazeera's Documentary channel.

Filmography
2001: L'eau à la bouche (TV)
2001: Cirque du Soleil: Fire Within (TV series)
2005: Le Dernier cycle (web, short film)
2006: Enfants de la balle (TV)
2007: Portrait de dame par un groupe (Documentary)
2008: Seules (TV)
2009: Pachamama (TV series)
2011: Rap arabe
2016: Montreal, White City (Montréal la blanche) (film)

Awards
In 2003, the series he co-directed, Cirque du Soleil: Fire Within, won an Emmy Award.
In 2007, his film Portrait de dame par un groupe won the "Prix AQCC" (Association québécoise des critiques de cinéma) for "2007 Best Documentary Short".
In 2011, his film Rap arabe won the "Prix ACIC / ONF" (National Film Board of Canada) for "Best Independent Production" in the section Regards d'ici.

References

External links
Bachir Bensaddek MySpace

Year of birth missing (living people)
Living people
Canadian people of Algerian-Berber descent
Algerian film directors
Algerian emigrants to Canada
Berber people
Canadian documentary film directors
Canadian television directors
Film directors from Montreal